Jane Roderick is a British slalom canoeist who competed from the late 1970s to the mid-1980s. She won three silver medals at the ICF Canoe Slalom World Championships, earning them in 1981 (K-1 team) and 1983 (K-1, K-1 team).

References

British female canoeists
Living people
Year of birth missing (living people)
Place of birth missing (living people)
Medalists at the ICF Canoe Slalom World Championships